Seyyed Hasan (also Romanized as Seyyed Ḩasan; also known as Saiyid Hasan and Seyyed Ḩasan-e Do) is a village in Shahid Modarres Rural District, in the Central District of Shushtar County, Khuzestan Province, Iran. At the 2006 census, its population was 318, in 59 families.

References 

Populated places in Shushtar County